Svante Dahlström (14 October 1883 – 21 January 1965) was a Finland-Swedish historian. He married music educator Greta Dahlström in 1925 and was the father of musicologist .

Dahlström was born in Turku, Finland, in 1883 to Johan Edvard Dahlström and Augusta Charlotta Hallqvist. After graduating in 1901, he became a Bachelor of Philosophy in 1910, was the first administrative director of the Åbo Academy Foundation from 1917 to 1920 and secretary of the academy's consistory from 1918 to 1944. At the University of Helsinki, Dahlström was the secretary of the student society Prometheus, an organization promoting freedom of religion; he worked together with philosopher and sociologist Edvard Westermarck. He was awarded a licentiate of philosophy in 1929, was docent (associate professor) of Nordic history from 1930 to 1944, an associate professor from 1944 to 1950 and a doctor of philosophy in 1948. 

He died in Turku, Finland in 1965.

References 
 Dahlström, Svante in Svenskt författarlexikon 1. 1900–1940
 Dahlström, Svante in Biografiskt lexikon för Finland (2011)
 Dahlström, Svante in Uppslagsverket Finland (web edition, 2012). CC-BY-SA 4.0

1883 births

1965 deaths

People from Turku
20th-century Finnish historians
Academic staff of Åbo Akademi University
Swedish-speaking Finns